Poiretia algira is a species of land snail in the family Spiraxidae.

Poiretia algira is the type species of the genus Poiretia.

Distribution 
Distribution of the genus Poiretia include coastal regions of Algeria.

References 

Spiraxidae
Gastropods described in 1792